|}

This is a list of House of Assembly results for the 1996 Tasmanian election.

Results by division

Bass

Braddon

Denison

Franklin

Lyons

See also 

 1996 Tasmanian state election
 Candidates of the 1996 Tasmanian state election
 Members of the Tasmanian House of Assembly, 1996-1998

References 

Results of Tasmanian elections
1996 elections in Australia